Esperanto is the ninth studio album by new-age/jazz group Shadowfax. It was nominated for the Grammy Award for Best New Age Album in 1993, losing out to Enya's Shepherd Moons.

The cover art is by Mimi LaPlant.

Track listing 
 "The Return of the Nairobi Trio" (Chuck Greenberg) – 5:12
 "Neither Here Nor There" (Armen Chakmakian, Greenberg) – 5:31
 "Foundwind" (Phil Maggini) – 5:02
 "Moonskater" (Greenberg, Chakmakian) – 4:19
 "Tropico Blue" (Greenberg) – 3:54
 "Tanah Lot" (Maggini) – 5:07
 "Duet for Shar" (Maggini) – 5:44
 "Include Me Out" (Stuart Nevitt, Eric Gabriel) – 4:46
 "Blue in the Face" (Nevitt) – 5:28

Personnel 
 Chuck Greenberg – Lyricon and WX-7 wind synthesizers, soprano saxophone, C-Concert, alto, Chilean, Indian and African flutes, bass clarinet
 Stu Nevitt – drums, cymbals, DrumKAT Controller Axis – E Pedal, Ensoniq EPS & EPS 16+ Samplers, Kawai XD-5 & K4 Modules, sampled & synthesized talking drum on "Neither Here Nor There", balafons on "Include Me Out"; tbilat, castanets, tambourine, Bushman dance rattles and hand claps
 Phil Maggini – electric bass, additional keyboards
 Armen Chakmakian – grand piano, Korg M1, Roland U-20, Ensoniq EPS 16+, Roland D-50

Additional personnel 
 L. Shankar – vocals on 6, double violin on 6
 Emil Richards – dumbek on 1 6, flapamba on 1 5 6, pipe gamelan on 1 6, Moroccan tambourine on 1, sampled bass marimba on 3, udu on 5, kendang on 6, hand claps on 6, crotales on 6, sampled bass marimba on 6 and bass boobams on 6
 Cash McCall – guitar on 9
 Ramon Yslas – congas on 2 3 8, shekere on 2, udu on 2, triangle on 2, bongos on 3, hand percussion on 8

Charts

References

External links 
 https://web.archive.org/web/20140714132826/http://www.chuckgreenberg.com/ESPERANTO.htm

1992 albums
Shadowfax (band) albums